The German-American Treue der Union Monument (Loyalty to the Union), is located in the Kendall County community of Comfort in the U.S. state of Texas. It was dedicated on August 10, 1866 to commemorate the German-Texans who died at the 1862 Nueces massacre. Thirty-four were killed, some executed after being taken prisoner, for refusing to sign loyalty oaths to the Confederacy. With the exception of those drowned in the Rio Grande, the remains of the murdered are buried at the site of the monument. This monument was the first authorized to fly the Star-Spangled Banner at half-mast in perpetuity.
It was listed on the U.S. National Register of Historic Places in 1978.

The battle
In 1862, the Confederate States of America imposed martial law on Central Texas, due to resistance to the Civil War. Jacob Kuechler served as a guide for sixty-one conscientious objectors attempting to flee to Mexico. Scottish born Confederate irregular James Duff and his Duff's Partisan Rangers pursued and overtook  them at the Nueces River.

Thirty-four were killed, some executed after being taken prisoner. Jacob Kuechler survived the Nueces massacre. The cruelty shocked the people of Gillespie County and surrounding areas. Two thousand took to the hills to escape Duff's reign of terror.

The monument
On August 19, 1865, Eduard Degener, Eduard Steves, and William Heuermann paid $20 for a lot in Comfort, for the purpose of building a monument. The bodies of those who drowned in the massacre were never recovered. The bodies of the remaining massacre victims were recovered for burial by local residents in a mass grave on the lot purchased by Degener, Steves and Heuermann. On August 20, 1865, at Comfort, Texas, three hundred people attended the funeral for the remains of the victims of the massacre. The funeral cortege was accompanied by Federal troops who fired a salute over the mass grave. Edward Degener, father of victims Hugo and Hilmar, delivered the eulogy.

With donations from local residents and families of the victims, the Treue der Union Monument was dedicated on August 10, 1866 in Kendall County. The obelisk stands twenty feet high and was constructed of native limestone by local stonemasons and several carvers. The main obelisk weighs , with the top containing the original four name tablets. The United States 1865 flag has thirty-six stars, representing the number of states at the time of the monument dedication. On the lawn at the base are four name tablets in German. Inside the second course of the monument is a time capsule.

In 1994, the Comfort Heritage Foundation oversaw a restoration conducted by Boerne stonemason Karl H. Kuhn.

Names on Treue der Union Monument

In popular culture

The 'Treue der Union'monument (1866) has been broadly asserted to be the first monument of the Civil War, and the first Union monument raised on "Confederate" soil. Other Union monuments in former slave states include the Grand Army of the Republic Memorial (Judsonia, Arkansas), the Grand Army of the Republic Memorial (Siloam Springs, Arkansas), the Grand Army of the Republic Memorial Hall (St. Cloud, Florida), Union memorials and graves at Arlington National Cemetery, and numerous monuments at battlefields such as at Vicksburg, Mississippi.
 In an undated entry about the Nueces massacre in The Handbook of Texas Online, the Texas State Historical Association asserts ""It is the only German-American monument to the Union in the South where the remains of those killed in battle are buried, and where, since 1866, a thirty-six star U.S. flag is permitted to fly at half-staff."
 As recently as 2012, in the book Texans and War: New Interpretations of the State's Military History published by Texas A & M University Press, authors Alexander Mendoza and Charles David Grear make the claim that it is "the only shrine to the Union erected by inhabitants on former Confederate soil."
 The 2008 book Civil War Sites: The Official Guide to the Civil War Discovery Trail, compiled by the Civil War Preservation Trust, lists it as "the only memorial to the Union (outside national cemeteries) in Confederate territory, and only one of six places in the nation permitted by Congress to fly the flag at half-staff in perpetuity (and the only one of these to fly the flag with thirty-six stars)."
 In 2006, authors Walter D. Kamphoefner, Wolfgang Helbich Susan Carter Vogel and asserted in Germans in the Civil War: The Letters They Wrote Home that it is "the only monument of its kind in the South."

According to the National Park Service, the 32nd Indiana Monument at Cave Hill National Cemetery in Kentucky "is the oldest Civil War memorial in the country." The 32nd Indiana Infantry Regiment of the Union Army was composed primarily of soldiers of German ancestry. After the December 1861 Battle of Rowlett's Station, regiment private August Bloedner created the limestone memorial in the German language as a tribute to his regiment's fatalities. Also known as the August Bloedner Monument, both the monument and the bodies of those it honors are together in the cemetery.

In a 2012 article for The Southwestern Historical Quarterly, physician and US Army veteran Frank Wilson Kiel sorted known facts from lore about the monument. Citing monuments to the Union on Southern soil, he names two memorials in Tennessee, Greeneville and Cleveland, as well as three others in Texas, Denison, Dallas and New Braunfels. The claim of Treue der Union being the oldest is discredited by the 1863 Hazen Brigade Monument at Stones River National Battlefield in Tennessee and the 1861 August Bloedner Monument in Kentucky.  Kiel traces the trail of misinformation back as far as 1938.  Accordingly, he states that there is no protocol for flying a flag at half-mast, but rather a matter of choice for non-governmental institutions such as the Comfort Heritage Foundation. The misunderstanding stemmed from personal communications between one congressman and two different individuals associated with the monument. Congress never passed legislation on the issue.

See also

 German Americans in the Civil War
 National Register of Historic Places listings in Kendall County, Texas

Footnotes

References

External links

1866 establishments in Texas
1866 sculptures
Buildings and structures completed in 1866
Buildings and structures in Kendall County, Texas
German-American culture in Texas
Historic district contributing properties in Texas
Limestone sculptures in the United States
Monuments and memorials in Texas
Monuments and memorials on the National Register of Historic Places in Texas
National Register of Historic Places in Kendall County, Texas
Obelisks in the United States
Stone sculptures in Texas
Texas in the American Civil War
Union (American Civil War) monuments and memorials